The Revenant: Original Motion Picture Soundtrack is a soundtrack album for the 2015 film, The Revenant, composed by Ryuichi Sakamoto and Alva Noto with additional music by Bryce Dessner. It was released digitally on December 25, 2015, and on CD on January 8, 2016 by Milan Records.

Overview
In September 2015, Japanese musician Ryuichi Sakamoto was announced as the composer for director Alejandro González Iñárritu's The Revenant. The two originally came in contact with each other after Iñárritu used songs of Sakamoto's in his 2006 film Babel. Following a year-long professional hiatus in 2014 after being diagnosed with a type of throat cancer, Sakamoto's work on The Revenant marked his return to the industry despite still being in the middle of recovery. In October 2015, it was revealed that Alva Noto (the stage name for Carsten Nicolai) and The National's Bryce Dessner would join Sakamoto in scoring the film. Alva Noto, a frequent collaborator of Sakamoto's, was brought in personally by Sakamoto due to his concerns of health and fulfilling the scope of the score. "What reason I called Carsten was simply, physically, the amount of music for this film is just gigantic," said Sakamoto in an interview with Rolling Stone "And naturally Alejandro wants acoustic music, like strings or whatever and very, um, edgy electronic music. Processed music. So it seemed very naturally to call Carsten you know?"

Primary scoring sessions with Sakamoto took place throughout October 2015 at Bastyr Chapel's Seattlemusic Scoring Stage in Seattle.

Milan Records released the soundtrack album digitally on December 25, 2015 and on CD on January 8, 2016. While the soundtrack album features the music composed specifically for the film, there are many contemporary compositions featured in the film.

Reception

The musical score has received positive reviews.

Writing for New York magazine, Justin Davidson compared Sakamoto's score to the contemporaneous score by Ennio Morricone for The Hateful Eight, stating: Iñárritu made a completely different choice of composer: Ryuichi Sakamoto, who came to film from a career in experimental electronics... Sakamoto's is the more successful score. Both films slouch toward inevitable spasms of bloodshed, with long pensive stretches in between... Sakamoto slowly progresses through glacial chords that build toward a fortissimo horizon... The score doesn't so much follow the action here as lead it, urging the fighters on, even as it registers their single-minded lunacy.

The score was nominated for Best Original Score at the 2016 Golden Globe Awards, and Best Film Music at the 2016 British Academy Film Awards (BAFTAs), in both cases it was beaten by  Morricone's soundtrack.

The score was ruled ineligible for the Academy Award for Best Original Score at the 2016 Oscars because it was "assembled from the music of more than one composer". 20th Century Fox appealed against the decision and Sakamoto wrote a letter to the academy explaining his work. Director Iñárritu was particularly unhappy about the decision. Speaking to Indiewire, Iñárritu said 
The Academy is demanding that the way young musicians approach making music for film is narrow. That's super sad, they should be exploring new ways. Music is so powerful, that's an undeniable shame. This is the second time they are not doing it right for colleagues in the work. And this is scandalous.

Track listing

Personnel

Production
 Ryuichi Sakamoto – composer/conductor
 Alva Noto – composer
 Bryce Dessner – composer
 André de Ridder – conductor
 stargaze – orchestra
 David Sabee – contractor
 Simon James – concertmaster
 Norika Sora – music production supervisor

Management
 Christine Bergren – music clearance and legal
 Merle Scheske – orchestra manager
 Jon Schluckerbier – stage manager
 Dave West – stage manager

Orchestration
 Hildur Guðnadóttir – cello
 Daniel Orthey, Gunnar Kötke, David Gutfleisch, Felix Ernst – Frantic Percussion Ensemble
 Motoko Oya – ondes Martenot
 Alex Petchu – additional percussion
 Aart Strootman – music preparation
 Stephen Feigenbaum – music preparation
 Audrey DeRoche – score supervisor

Technical
 Martin Hernández – music editor
 Joseph S. Debeasi – music editor
 Richard Henderson – music editor
 Steven Saltzman – music editor
 Curt Sobel – music editor
 Terry Wilson – music editor
 Conrad Hensel – score recordist/score mixer
 Alec Fellman – production manager/assistant engineer
 Jonathan Feurich – recording engineer (Hamburg)
 Zak – recording engineer (Tokyo)
 Alex Venguer – recording engineer (New York)
 Kiyoharu Terada – assistant engineer (Tokyo)
 Nick S.S. Banns – assistant engineer (New York)
 Fernando Aponte – consulting engineer (New York)
 Kaz Tsujio – piano technician (New York)
 Yoshie May – piano technician (Los Angeles)
 Takeshi Sakai – piano technician (Tokyo)
 Hiroaki Mizutani – piano technician (Tokyo)
 Scott Smith – score mixer
 Conrad Hansel – scoring engineer
 Kory Kruckenberg – Pro Tools engineer
 John Winters – second engineer
 Eduardo De La Paz Canel – Pro Tools operator
 Tom Russbueldt – recording engineer

Additional music
Additional music credited in The Revenant:

Charts

References

External links
 The Revenant at Milan Records

2010s film soundtrack albums
2015 soundtrack albums
Ryuichi Sakamoto albums
Alva Noto albums